Gaobeidian Area is an area and a township of Chaoyang District, Beijing, located west of and within the 5th Ring Road. It borders Pingfang Township to the north, Sanjianfang Township to the east, Dougezhuang and Wangsiying Townships to the south, Balizhuang and Jianwai Subdistricts as well as Nanmofang Township to the west. , it has a total population of 109,631.

The name of this township, Gaobeidian, first appear on record in 1787, along with an older name Jiaoting.

History

Administrative Divisions 
As of 2021, there are 32 subdivisions within Gaobeidian Area:

See also 
 List of township-level divisions of Beijing

References

Chaoyang District, Beijing
Areas of Beijing